Zvonimir "Zvone" Boban (born 8 October 1968) is a Croatian former footballer who currently works at UEFA as the Chief of Football. Boban played as a midfielder and was usually deployed as an attacking midfielder. He played most of his professional career for Italian club Milan with whom he won four Serie A titles and one UEFA Champions League title. He also captained the Croatia national team which won third place at the 1998 FIFA World Cup.

Before 1990 and the international recognition of Croatia's national team, Boban had played for the Yugoslavia under-20 team which won the 1987 World Youth Championship. Boban scored three times in this tournament, as well as scoring in the final (drawn 1–1 with West Germany) and then converting the decisive penalty in the shootout. Having made his debut for the senior Yugoslavia team in 1988, Boban switched to playing for Croatia after the national team's inception, debuting against Romania in December 1990. Having appeared seven times for Yugoslavia, scoring once, Boban was capped 49 times for Croatia, scoring 12 goals, between 1992 and 1999.

Since retiring from playing in 2002, Boban gained a history degree from the University of Zagreb. He has also become a football pundit on Croatian and Italian television, working most notably for Sky Italia and RTL Televizija.

Club career

Dinamo Zagreb
Born in Imotski, Boban started his career with Dinamo Zagreb. He made his debut for the team in the 1985–86 season, aged 16. He would play 109 games for the club over six seasons, scoring 45 goals and becoming club captain aged 19.

Dinamo Zagreb–Red Star Belgrade riot

In a game against Red Star Belgrade on 13 May 1990, Boban kicked a police officer in the face for assaulting a Dinamo supporter after a riot broke out in the stadium. This incident made Boban a nationalist icon in Croatia.

It is cited by some as the expression of Croatian discontent with the Yugoslav regime. It also earned him a suspension from the Yugoslav national team, causing him to miss the 1990 World Cup in Italy. In January 2011, the match (due to the incident) was named by CNN as one of "five football games that changed the world". The police officer (who turned out to be a Bosniak) later forgave Boban for his action.

Serie A
A.C. Milan signed Boban in 1991 in a deal worth £8 million. Milan immediately loaned him to Bari, as they felt he needed time to settle in Italy without counting as one of the 3 non-Italian players the club was limited to at the time. Bari were relegated in this season, but Boban ably demonstrated his ability in the team and was recalled to Milan. He stayed in the club for nine seasons, and enjoyed great success with them, helping the team to the 1994 Champions League title and contributing to the 1995 campaign in which they ended as runners-up. Playing 251 games for Milan and scoring 30 goals, Boban won four Serie A titles, as well as three Italian Supercups. In the second leg of the 1994 UEFA Super Cup Final against Arsenal in Milan, he scored the opening goal in Milan's 2–0 aggregate victory. In August 2001, with his role at Milan diminished due to the signing of Rui Costa, he was loaned to La Liga side Celta Vigo where he played in only four league matches. Unhappy with his role as a substitute, he retired in October 2001 and finished his last season earlier than he intended.

International career

Yugoslavia
Boban played a big part in Yugoslavia's win in 1987 World Youth Championship. He scored three goals for Yugoslavia in this tournament, and also scored a decisive penalty in the final shootout. At the full international level, he earned seven caps for Yugoslavia between 1988 and 1991, debuting against the Republic of Ireland on 27 April 1988. He played his last game for Yugoslavia on 16 May 1991 against the Faroe Islands, during which he scored his only goal for Yugoslavia.

Croatia
When the nation of Croatia declared its independence of Yugoslavia, Boban left Yugoslavia to play for Croatia. He played his first international match for Croatia against a Romanian side on 22 December 1990. The match was considered unofficial because Croatia at that time was not affiliated to FIFA. This match was only the second fixture Croatia had played as an independent nation since 1956. Boban played his last match for the national team in a friendly against France on 13 November 1999. He blamed back pain for his decision to quit international football, but would go on to play in two more seasons of club football. In his career with the Croatian national team, Boban won 49 international caps and scored 12 goals.

1998 World Cup
Boban was a member of the Croatian team that finished third at the 1998 World Cup, captaining the squad at that tournament, as he had at the 1996 European Football Championship. A mistake he made in the semi-final allowed France to equalize immediately after Croatia had fought hard to earn a one-goal lead. To make matters worse, Boban was injured and wanted to come off at half time but stayed on until the 65th minute, when he was replaced by Silvio Maric. France won the match 2–1 and eventually won the tournament. Croatia went on to defeat the Netherlands, with Boban providing the pass to Davor Šuker to score the winner, allowing Croatia to attain third place and receive the bronze medal.

Style of play
Nicknamed Zorro, Boban was a talented and creative yet tenacious and hard-working player, known for his use of feints to beat opponents. He was gifted with excellent vision, passing range, dribbling skills, technical ability, and an eye for the final ball; he mixed these attributes with a unique tactical versatility and intelligence, which enabled him to be deployed in several midfield and offensive positions throughout his career. In addition to his preferred playmaking role behind the forwards as an attacking midfielder, he was also capable of playing on the wing, as a central midfielder, or even as a supporting striker, due to his powerful and accurate bending shots from distance; he was also effective from set-pieces. Throughout his career, he also became known for his vocal presence, determination and aggression on the pitch, as well as his strong character.

Post-playing career
Boban officially retired from football in 2002 after receiving little pitch time at Celta Vigo. On 7 October 2002, Boban organised and played in a farewell testimonial, with Croatia's 1998 World Cup team supported by tennis star Goran Ivanišević matching up against a World XI featuring such stars as Rivaldo, Marco van Basten and Lothar Matthäus.

Since retiring from football, Boban, always known to be a literary man, completed his history degree at the University of Zagreb. He graduated from the Faculty of Humanities and Social Sciences, University of Zagreb in 2004, with a thesis named "Christianity in the Roman Empire".

He also started a career in sports journalism, being the administration president for the Croatian daily sports newspaper Sportske novosti, a co-commentator during live broadcasts of the Croatian national team's away matches on the country's commercially-funded national TV station RTL Televizija as well as a commentator for SKY Italia and columnist for La Gazzetta dello Sport. As a commentator, Boban has become known as frank and outspoken. Boban also owns a restaurant in Zagreb, called "Boban".

Boban has always maintained that he would never become a coach.

FIFA
On 30 May 2016, Boban was appointed FIFA's Deputy Secretary-General, focusing on developing the game and the organization of competitions. He has been immediately among the endorsers of the implementation of technology on the field and played a fundamental role in the development of the video assistant referee. In fact, during the 2018 World Cup played in Russia, the first-ever with the VAR, he lived in Moscow alongside Pierluigi Collina, chairman of FIFA's Referees' Committee, and Massimo Busacca, head of FIFA's Refereeing Department, thus bringing referees' world closer to the Institutions. On 14 June 2019, after three years in office, he resigned. FIFA President Gianni Infantino had words of thanks for the Croatian: "I cannot thank Zvonimir enough for everything he has done for FIFA and for the game of football over the last three years by our side. Nobody embodies football better than he does and he has always worked for the good of the game. Many of the positive changes that we have made over the last three years could not have been achieved without Zvone. He has shown the same commitment, heart, and passion at FIFA that characterized his attitude on the pitch. We will miss him a lot at FIFA." One of Infantino's collaborators at FIFA said it was a massive loss, especially now that his work was beginning to make a difference for the whole organization.

Milan
In June 2019, Boban resigned from his FIFA job to return to his former club A.C. Milan where he was hired as a Chief Football Officer, the closest cooperator of the club's technical director Paolo Maldini. However, he was sacked on 7 March 2020, after he publicly criticized club owner Ivan Gazidis, who negotiated a possible job offer with German manager Ralf Rangnick for the 2020−21 season behind Boban and Maldini's backs.

UEFA
In April 2021, Boban was hired by UEFA as the Chief of Football, first ever person to hold that position.

Personal life
Boban married Leonarda Lončar, a fashion designer, in 1994. They have five children: adopted children Marija, Gabrijel, Marta, Rafael, and a biological daughter Ruža (Rose). In 2021, the couple separated.

Boban is also a keen tennis player. He is known to be close friends with Goran Ivanišević, with whom he plays at his private indoor clay tennis court.

Career statistics

Club
Sources:

International

International goals
Results list Yugoslavia's and Croatia's goal tallies first.

Honours

Club
Milan
Serie A: 1992–93, 1993–94, 1995–96, 1998–99
Supercoppa Italiana: 1992, 1993, 1994
UEFA Champions League: 1993–94
UEFA Super Cup: 1994

International
Yugoslavia
FIFA World Youth Championship: 1987
UEFA European Under-21 Football Championship: 1990 (Runners-up)

Croatia
FIFA World Cup: 1998 (Third place)

Individual
FIFA World Youth Championship Silver Ball: 1987
Croatian Footballer of the Year: 1991, 1999
Ballon d'Or: 1994 (24th place)
SN Yellow Shirt Award: 1991
Franjo Bučar State Award for Sport: 1998, 2002
AC Milan: The 20 Greatest Rossoneri of All-Time
A.C. Milan Hall of Fame
Fair Play Menarini Award 2017
Globe Soccer Awards 2018: Special Career Award

Orders
 Order of Danica Hrvatska with face of Franjo Bučar: 1995
 Order of the Croatian Trefoil: 1998

References

External links

 

1968 births
Living people
A.C. Milan players
S.S.C. Bari players
Association football midfielders
RC Celta de Vigo players
Croatia international footballers
Croatian expatriate footballers
Croatian footballers
Dual internationalists (football)
Expatriate footballers in Italy
Expatriate footballers in Spain
Faculty of Humanities and Social Sciences, University of Zagreb alumni
Franjo Bučar Award winners
GNK Dinamo Zagreb players
La Liga players
Sportspeople from Imotski
Serie A players
UEFA Euro 1996 players
Yugoslav First League players
Yugoslav footballers
Yugoslavia international footballers
1998 FIFA World Cup players
Croatian expatriate sportspeople in Italy
Croatian expatriate sportspeople in Spain
UEFA Champions League winning players